Mark English may refer to:

 Mark English (illustrator) (born 1933), American illustrator and painter
 Mark English (athlete)  (born 1993), Irish middle-distance runner